Brigadier Dame Anne Thomson,  was a British military nurse, matron and nursing administrator. She was Matron-in-Chief of Queen Alexandra's Royal Army Nursing Corps (QARANC) from 1948 to 31 January 1949, and Director of Army Nursing Services from 1 February 1949 to 1952. She was succeeded by Dame Helen Gillespie.

Anne Thomson was the first officer of Queen Alexandra's Imperial Military Nursing Service to reach the rank of brigadier in the British Army, which she did in 1950. Four years later, she was named a Colonel Commandant of the QARANC on 12 December 1954. She also held the title of King's Honorary Nursing Sister (KHNS).

References

External links
Gazette Issue 39628 published on the 19 September 1952, p. 4467

Queen Alexandra's Royal Army Nursing Corps officers
Dames Commander of the Order of the British Empire
Year of birth unknown
Year of death unknown
Place of death missing
British Army personnel of World War II
Members of the Royal Red Cross
British Army brigadiers